No. 666 Squadron RCAF was originally an RCAF Air Observation Post (AOP) squadron formed during the Second World War. It was manned principally by Royal Canadian Artillery (RCA) and Royal Canadian Air Force (RCAF) personnel.

History
Numbers 651 to 663 Squadrons of the RAF were Air Observation Post units working closely with army units in artillery spotting and liaison. Three additional squadrons were Canadian, and approved on the RCAF list in the late summer of 1944: No. 664 Squadron RCAF, No. 665 Squadron RCAF, and No. 666 Squadron RCAF. The Canadian pilots were officers recruited from the Royal Canadian Artillery and trained to fly at No. 22 Elementary Flying Training School RAF Cambridge, and further trained for operational flying at No. 43 Operational Training Unit RAF, at RAF Andover.

The squadron was formed at RAF Andover, England, on 5 March 1945, the third Air Observation Post squadron consisting of Canadian personnel to be formed at RAF Andover, after a 1944 parliamentary debate in Ottawa, Ontario, Canada, resulted in the approval of  three AOP squadrons to be added to the RCAF list, in support of the First Canadian Army. The squadron operated under the overall command of No. 70 Group, RAF Fighter Command.

Royal Canadian Artillery Major Dave Ely initially took command of each of the three squadrons, and was assisted by two RCAF Flight Lieutenants, D. Dougall (Acting Squadron Adjutant) and A.R. Woodhouse (Squadron Equipment officer). Major Ely was also assisted by nine AOP trained Royal Artillery Officers, who began training the squadron's other ranks.

In the last week of March 1945, 666 Squadron's aircraft – sixteen Auster Mark V's – began to arrive, along with the squadron's ground transport. On 7 May 1945, ten qualified Canadian AOP pilots were posted to the squadron, and from their ranks, Captain A.B. Stewart was elevated to Squadron Captain. In April, 666 began a succession of moves: on 17 April, to Alfriston Aerodrome; on 28 May, to Gilze-Rijen, the Netherlands; on 6 June, to be headquartered at Hilversum, from where the squadron's three subordinate Flights were dispersed to Dordrecht, Alkmaar, and Ede.

On 12 June, Major Ely left 666 Squadron after being reassigned to Canadian Far East Force (CFEF), and was replaced by Major A.B. Stewart as Officer Commanding. Through the summer of 1945, the squadron was tasked with 'air taxi' duties in support of 1st Canadian Infantry Division, 3rd Canadian Infantry Division, and #1 Canadian AGRA (Army Groups Royal Artillery). On 25 June, 666 Squadron moved from Hilversum to Apeldoorn, the Netherlands, joining 664 Squadron and 665 Squadron in that location, then under the overall command of the First Canadian Army.

With the disbanding of 665 (AOP) Squadron, on 10 July 1945, many of the remaining personnel from that squadron were transferred to 666 Squadron. Tasking thereafter included VIP, Courier, and Communications Flight duties in support of the Canadian Army Occupation Force (CAOF). No. 666 Squadron RCAF in its turn was disbanded at Apeldoorn, the Netherlands, on 31 October 1945. The squadron had no motto or heraldic badge assigned to it.

Squadron bases

Squadron membership
 Major D.R. Ely
 Major A.B. Stewart
 Captain A.D. Carpenter ('B' Flight Commander)
 Captain J.M. Doohan
 Captain R.O. Lundgren ('C' Flight Commander)
 Captain A.S. MacPherson ('A' Flight Commander)
 Maurice Bouchard ('A' Flight Cook)

References

Notes

Bibliography

 Blackburn, George. Where The Hell are the Guns?, Toronto, Ontario, Canada: McClelland & Stewart Publishing, 1997. .
 Fromow, Lt-Col. D.L. Canada's Flying Gunners: A History of the Air Observation Post of the Royal Regiment of Canadian Artillery. Ottawa, Ontario, Canada: Air Observation Post Pilots Association, 2002. .
 Halley, James J. The Squadrons of the Royal Air Force & Commonwealth, 1918–88. Tonbridge, Kent, UK: Air-Britain (Historians), 1988. .
 Jefford, C.G. RAF Squadrons, a Comprehensive Record of the Movement and Equipment of all RAF Squadrons and their Antecedents since 1912. Shrewsbury, Shropshire, UK: Airlife Publishing, 2001. .
 Knight, Darrell. Artillery Flyers at War: A History of the 664, 665, and 666 ‘Air Observation Post’ Squadrons of the Royal Canadian Air Force. Bennington, Vermont, USA: Merriam Press, 2010. .
 Parham, Major General H.J. and E.M.G. Belfield (With a Foreword by Field Marshal Lord Alanbrooke, Master Gunner). Unarmed Into Battle: The Story of the Air Observation Post. Wiltshire: Picton Publishing, 1986.
 Stewart, Major A.B. Battle History 666. Epe, the Netherlands, 1945. Republished by Abel Book Company, Calgary, 2006.

Primary source interviews
 Ms. Francis Gales (Widow of Captain 'Tony' Eaton, MC).
 Gunner R.D. 'Ray' Knight, former member and observer of 665 (AOP) Squadron; 666 (AOP) Squadron, RCAF (Contributor's father)
 Gunner Floyd Osterhaut, former member and observer of 665 (AOP) Squadron.
 Captain F.R. 'Ray' Irwin, former member and pilot of 664 (AOP) Squadron, ; 665 (AOP) Squadron, RCAF; 666 (AOP) Squadron.
 Captain Bev Dane Baily, former member and pilot of 665 (AOP) Squadron.
 George Blackburn, MC.
 Linda Nicks (Daughter of Maurice Bouchard)

External links
Canadian Forces Directorate of History and Heritage

Royal Canadian Air Force squadrons
Air force units and formations of Canada in World War II
Military units and formations established in 1944
Military units and formations disestablished in 1945